Revaha (lit. prosperity) is a religious moshav in south-central Israel. Located in the southern Shephelah near Kiryat Gat, it falls under the jurisdiction of Shafir Regional Council.

History
Revaha was established in 1953 by Jewish immigrants from Kurdistan on lands which had formerly belonged to the depopulated  Palestinian village of Karatiyya. It is located close to  Hatta, but not on its village land.

The majority of residents are national-religious.

References

Kurdish-Jewish culture in Israel
Moshavim
Religious Israeli communities
Populated places established in 1953
Populated places in Southern District (Israel)
1953 establishments in Israel